John Richard Clark Hall (1855 – 6 August 1931) was a British scholar of Old English, and a barrister. In his professional life, Hall worked as a clerk at the Local Government Board in Whitehall. Admitted to Gray's Inn in 1881 and called to the bar in 1896, Hall became principal clerk two years later.

Hall's A Concise Anglo-Saxon Dictionary became a widely used work upon its 1894 publication, and after multiple revisions remains in print as of 2021. Hall's other work on Beowulf included a metrical translation in 1914, and the translation and collection of Knut Stjerna's Swedish papers on the poem into the 1912 work Essays on Questions Connected with the Old English Poem of Beowulf.

In the final decade of his life, Hall's writings took to a Christian theme. The Society for Promoting Christian Knowledge published two of his works in this time: Herbert Tingle, and Especially his Boyhood, a memoir to Hall's lifelong friend that highlighted his early methods of self-education, and Birth-Control and Self-Control, a pamphlet on the ethics of birth control. Hall also wrote Is Our Christianity a Failure?, a 1928 book described by The Spectator as a "layman's attempt to express and defend his religion".

Early life 

John Richard Clark Hall was born in 1855 in Peckham, outside London. He was the only son of James John Hall, the principal clerk in the Custom House, City of London. Previously, his father had worked in the Tea and East India Department of HM Customs. An uncle, Joseph Hall, lived in Golcar Hill. John Hall later described having been "brought up in an atmosphere of old-fashioned Toryism and Churchmanship". He spent parts of his childhood on the outskirts of Peckham, where he met his lifelong friend Herbert Tingle. Among other amusements, Hall and Tingle devised a "brick world" from blocks, with, as Tingle wrote, "railways and parliamentary elections, obstructionists, and lectures on science, and examinations, and all the complicated apparatus of a modern country in full blast"; by 1919, Hall still possessed nearly 200 documents outlining the world's structure, including newspapers, results of general elections, postage stamps, a shipping company's lists of sailings, a theatre programme, and railway timetables. The two also obtained a toy printing press. The results were good enough that at least three pamphlets with the "Tingle & Hall" imprint were acquired by the British Library, and a fourth by the Rakow Research Library at the Corning Museum of Glass in New York. Hall himself discovered one of the former when older, and wondered much how it had reached there.

Hall had what he later termed an "education on more or less orthodox classical lines, with the inevitable examinations". He was educated at the Collegiate School in Peckham, and at St Olave's Grammar School, in Southwark. In May 1871, when aged around 16, he won the second prize for the best essay on "the duty of kindness to animals", a competition opened to students of about 120 London schools by the Royal Society for the Prevention of Cruelty to Animals. By age 18 he had obtained certificates at both the Cambridge and Oxford Junior Local Examinations, along with a senior certificate from the latter, earning him the title Associate in Arts at Oxford.

In 1872 and 1873 Hall passed the Civil Service examinations, coming first out of more than 170 candidates for clerkships. Hall was placed in the Local Government Board. According to a local newspaper, he was "specially prepared" for the examination by a Mr. Braginton. On 16 May 1881, Hall was admitted to Gray's Inn. In 1889 he received a Bachelor of Arts from the University of London, and in 1891 a Master of Arts in English and French from the same school. By 1894, he had also attained a PhD. Hall was finally called to the bar in 1896, having studied both Roman law, and constitutional law and legal history. Upon the retirement of a Mr. R. B. Allen in November 1898, Hall became the principal clerk in the Local Government Board.

Writing career 
Beginning shortly before he became a barrister, and continuing until shortly before his death, Hall wrote seven books alongside several shorter works. The first two, A Concise Anglo-Saxon Dictionary and Beowulf and the Fight at Finnsburg: A Translation into Modern English Prose, quickly became authoritative works that went through four editions each. Hall's third book, a translation of Swedish essays on Beowulf by Knut Stjerna, was similarly influential. Hall's later works were Christian themed, including two published by the Society for Promoting Christian Knowledge.

A Concise Anglo-Saxon Dictionary 

Hall's dictionary of Old English, subtitled For the Use of Students, quickly became a widely used work upon its publication in 1894. The work, issued four years before the final volume of An Anglo-Saxon Dictionary by Joseph Bosworth and Thomas Northcote Toller, filled the need of a complete Old English dictionary. "At last", wrote The Guardian, "we have a complete Anglo-Saxon dictionary, complete from A to the very end of the alphabet." Two years later, the publication of Henry Sweet's A Student's Dictionary of Anglo-Saxon provided a second modern compact dictionary. After Bosworth–Toller was completed in 1898, A Concise Anglo-Saxon Dictionary continued to serve prominently as an introductory, if smaller, resource; Hall, Bosworth–Toller, and Sweet were all eventually superseded by The Dictionary of Old English, issued by the University of Toronto starting in 1986.

The first edition of the dictionary attempted to ease access by ordering entries by the words as they were actually spelt in common editions of Old English texts, and critics noted that this introduced its own share of confusion. Hall eliminated this approach in a 1916 second edition, acknowledging that this "was admittedly an unscientific [approach], and opened the door to a good many errors and inconsistencies". Thenceforth he adopted the conventional method of using "normalised" entry words. Hall also began indicating words found only in poetical texts and providing the source of words recorded only once, and added cross-references to corresponding entries in the Oxford English Dictionary, then underway. The edition was "markedly superior to the first edition" according to a reviewer for Modern Philology, and according to Frederick Klaeber, its "outward make-up is almost an ideal one". In Journal of Education, a reviewer termed it "the most modern treatment of the most ancient usage of our language".

A third and significantly expanded edition of the dictionary followed in 1931; according to Francis Peabody Magoun, it was "to all intents and purposes [a] completely new edition", and "a notable monument to the memory of its author", who died the year of publication. A fourth edition—a reprinting with a supplement by the philologist Herbert Dean Meritt—came in 1960. This was reprinted by the University of Toronto Press starting in 1984, and is still in print as of 2021.

Beowulf 

In 1901, after publication of the first edition of his dictionary, Hall published a literal translation of Beowulf. It was largely praised at its outset, including by The Manchester Guardian for containing a "decidedly better" translation than any in current use, and by Chauncey Brewster Tinker for providing "a useful compendium of Beowulf material", although The Athenæum wrote that in striving to be too literal, it did not "go very far towards supplying the desideratum" of an "adequate prose version" of the poem. The first edition was followed by a corrected second in 1911. Such revision was "welcome", wrote the English philologist Allen Mawer, "for it is probably the best working translation that we have". The Athenæum, for its part, wrote that the work was "unaltered in general character", but "with considerable improvements". Posthumous third and fourth editions were edited by Charles Leslie Wrenn and published in 1940 and 1950, respectively. These contained an essay by J. R. R. Tolkien, "Prefatory Remarks on Prose Translation of 'Beowulf'", which was later restyled "[[On Translating Beowulf|On Translating  for the compilation The Monsters and the Critics, and Other Essays. Hall's translation—known simply as "Clark Hall"—was "still the 'crib of choice' in Oxford in the 1960s", according to Marijane Osborn, an Old English scholar and Beowulf translator who compiled a list of more than 300 translations and adaptations of the poem. A 2011 survey of Beowulf translations termed it "one of the most enduringly popular of all translations of the poem".

In 1910 Hall published a note on lines 1142–1145 of the poem in Modern Language Notes, and two years later he translated various papers by Stjerna into the work Essays on Questions Connected with the Old English Poem of Beowulf. "It is the great value of these essays", wrote Hall, "that in them Stjerna has collected all the material bearing on the poem of Beowulf which archæological research has yielded in the three Scandinavian countries up to the present time." Previously written in Swedish and published in a medley of obscure journals and Festschrifts before Stjerna's early death, Hall's translation gave them much a much broader audience—which English museum curator E. Thurlow Leeds called "a great service"—and added what Klaeber termed "the function of a conscientious and skilful editor besides". Although the chief reader would be "the Old English student", The Observer wrote, "the helmets and swords in Beowulf and the funeral obsequies of Beowulf and of Scyld... should serve to send many readers to the poem which has been translated by Dr. Clark Hall in an excellent prose version".

Hall followed up his literal Beowulf translation with a metrical translation in 1914. Writing for The Modern Language Review, professor of English and fellow Beowulf translator W. G. Sedgefield suggested that by "attempting to make a metrical version of the Beowulf in modern English, Dr Clark Hall has undertaken one of the most difficult tasks possible for a translator, and we intend no reflection on his ability and scholarship when we say that in our opinion he has not succeeded". Noting the difficulties of translating the poem, and what he termed "arbitrar[y]" choices by Hall, Sedgefield concluded that "Dr Hall would have done well not to try to improve on his excellent prose version of the poem." The metrical translation did not see a second edition, although it was republished in 2014.

Christianity 

Hall's obituary termed him a "protestant reformer", and several of his writings touched on the subject of Christianity. In 1919 and 1923, the Society for Promoting Christian Knowledge published two of his works. The former, Herbert Tingle, and Especially His Boyhood, served as a memoir to Hall's lifelong friend, who had died the year before,, and included an introduction by Bishop of Oxford Hubert Burge, The book was also marketed as a "book for educationists"; described how Tingle had only one year of formal schooling but devised methods of educating himself with self-made toys and games. In the journal School, a reviewer wrote that "Herbert Tingle apparently had never heard of Froebel or Montessori... yet his available knowledge made him a delightful companion his friend writes, and his independence of education so called would delight the soul of Henry Adams. Let all educators read this piece of Herbert Tingle's life and ponder on the essentials to be taught the young!" Writing for Journal of Education, another reviewer added that while Tingle seemed to be of no special account, and while "for the life of me I do not quite see why I read it, [but] we are glad there were two boys like Tingle and Hall and that after one of them passed on at the age of sixty-five the other has taken time to write about their boyhood days and ways."

Later works were more overtly Christian. Hall's 1923 pamphlet by the Society for Promoting Christian Knowledge, Birth-Control and Self-Control, criticised the ethics of birth control.{{sfn|The Servant of India|1924}} Five years later Hall published a book titled Is Our Christianity a Failure? The Contemporary Review called it an "earnest, fair-minded book, written with judicial weight of mind", while The Spectator termed it a "layman's attempt to express and defend his religion".

 Works 

 Books 
  
  
 
 
 
  
 
 
 
  
  
 Republished in 2014 as 
  
  
 

 Articles 
  
  

 Other 
 
  
  
 

 Tingle & Hall 
 
  
  
 

 Personal life 
Hall married Mary Ann Elizabeth Symes, of Kingston Russell, Dorset, on 29 November 1883; the ceremony was held in the adjacent village Long Bredy, with the rector Henry Pigou presiding. The two had four children, three of whom survived: Cecil Symes (born 20 September 1886), Irene Clark (born  1886), and the entomologist Wilfrid John (born 13 December 1892).

Hall was a member of the Yorkshire Philosophical Society, joining in 1910. Having spent time in Peckham as a child, he disparaged the "straphanger", or weekday commuter, which he blamed with divesting the suburb of its "mild air of suburban gentility" and turning it into "weekly property". Hall was in Switzerland during the outbreak of the First World War, and unable to move or communicate with friends for more than a fortnight. In 1925 he wrote to Notes and Queries'' to ascertain the origin of "an old broadside... purporting to be 'A True Copy of a Letter written by Jesus Christ'" and to be "a charm against evil spirits, miscarriage, etc.", which Hall said had been passed down by Yorkshire ancestors, and "looks like the kind of thing a pedlar might try to sell to ignorant folks". Among those who answered, Robert Priebsch identified it as "a late—though by no means the latest—offshoot of an interesting fiction... which, in my opinion, originated in Southern Gaul or Northern Spain towards the close of the sixth century, and which has enjoyed a tremendous spread all over Europe".

Hall died on 6 August 1931, at a nursing home in Eastbourne, East Sussex. His obituary noted that he had formerly been on the Local Government Board in Whitehall, and that he had left a £16,762 estate.

Notes

References

Bibliography 
 
  
 
 
  
  
  
  
  
  
  
  
  
  
  
  
  
  
  
  
  
  
  
  
  
  
  
  
  
  
  
  
  
  
  
  
  
  
  
  
  
  
  
  
  
  
  
  
  
 
  
  
  
  
  
  
 
  
  
 
  
  
  
  
  
  
  
  
  
 
  
  
  
  
  
  
  
  

1855 births
1931 deaths
Anglo-Saxon studies scholars
English barristers
English lexicographers
English translators